Richard Henry Mansell (born 24 April 1995) is an English professional golfer who plays on the European Tour.

Amateur career
Mansell attended Nova Southeastern University from 2014 to 2017, having previously spent one season at Newberry College.

Professional career
Mansell turned professional in 2017 and began playing on the PGA EuroPro Tour. He claimed his first professional win in July 2019 at the Cobra Puma Championship. He played on the Challenge Tour in 2019 and 2020, finishing fourth on the Road to Mallorca Rankings, gaining status on the European Tour for the 2021 season. The highlight of 2020 being runner-up finishes at the Andalucía Challenge de España and the dual-ranking Euram Bank Open. Mansell qualified for the 2021 Open Championship via final qualifying at Holinwell.

In October 2022, Mansell held the 54-hole lead at the Alfred Dunhill Links Championship. He had a four shot lead going into Sunday, but a final-round 76 seen him drop to tied-for-seventh place.

Amateur wins
2017 Armstrong Pirate Invite

Source:

Professional wins (1)

PGA EuroPro Tour wins (1)

Results in major championships

CUT = missed the half-way cut
"T" = tied

Team appearances
Amateur
Arnold Palmer Cup (representing Europe): 2017

Professional
Hero Cup (representing Great Britain & Ireland): 2023

References

External links

English male golfers
European Tour golfers
Nova Southeastern Sharks men's golfers
Newberry Wolves athletes
1995 births
Living people